The Descanso, Alpine and Pacific Railway is a  narrow gauge heritage railroad owned and being relocated by the Pacific Southwest Railway Museum in Campo, California. It was owned by Roy Athey and it opened in Alpine in May 1990. This little operation was a sole proprietorship and has one locomotive, a 1935 Brookville Equipment Corporation unit. The railroad had three stations; Shade, El Pozo and High Pass.  The railway offered free train rides and historical narration to the public on most Sundays.

Ownership and History 
The Descanso, Alpine and Pacific Railway was owned by Roy Athey. After building it in his backyard with his friends he continued to operate it free of charge to anyone who wanted to ride it. As of January 2018, he donated key parts of the railroad to the Pacific Southwest Railway Museum due to his inability to continue running the train.

References

External links

 Description and information

Heritage railroads in California
Narrow gauge railroads in California
2 ft gauge railways in the United States
Tourist attractions in San Diego County, California
Transportation in San Diego County, California